Frederick Moir may refer to:

 Frederick Moir (priest), Anglican priest
 Frederick Moir (African Lakes Corporation) (1852–1939), trader, road-builder and writer in Nyasaland, East Africa